Banking in Azerbaijan in its present form dates back to 1992, but it originates in the second half of the 19th century and continued through the Soviet period. It consists of the country's central bank, the Central Bank of Azerbaijan, founded on 11 February 1992, and other commercial banks. The commercial banks in the country are joint–stock. The only valid currency in Azerbaijan is the Azerbaijani manat. Only the Central Bank can issue manats. During the transition to a market economy in the 1990s, the banking system was not meeting the needs of socioeconomic development as expected, and followed old, Soviet laws. Banks in Azerbaijan have mandatory reserves, determination of norms, regulations of liabilities between creditors and depositors, and deposit insurance. These laws were introduced in 1996 after the system proved to violate laws and timely repayments of deposits. The country's banking system is now stable.

Legal basis 
Azerbaijan restored its independence on October 18, 1991. Besides the law "On Banks and Banking Activity in the Republic of Azerbaijan”, the law "On the National Bank of the Republic of Azerbaijan” was adopted on 7 August 1992. Manat - the national currency of the Republic of Azerbaijan was released on August 15 (together with ruble). Manat was declared the only means of payment in the country on 1 January 1994. In Article 19, paragraph 2 of the first Constitution of the Republic of Azerbaijan adopted in the referendum on November 12, 1995, it was reaffirmed that the right to issue and withdraw money from circulation only belongs to the National Bank. The law "On the National Bank of the Republic of Azerbaijan” and "On Banks and Banking Activity in the Republic of Azerbaijan were re-adopted in a new edition on dates 10 June 1996, and 14 June 1996, respectively. New bank laws allowed the banking system to become closer to the world banking experience and establish credit institutions. In order to adapt to the updated scientific and theoretical methods and the requirements of modern ongoing processes, the law "On the National Bank of the Republic of Azerbaijan" was adopted on December 10, 2004.  The law "On Banks" adopted on 16 January 2004, came into force on 30 March 2004. In connection with the Referendum Act named "On Additions and Amendments to the Constitution of the Republic of Azerbaijan" dated March 18, 2009, "National Bank of the Republic of Azerbaijan" was renamed to "The Central Bank of the Republic of Azerbaijan". As a result of measures taken for the creation of deposit insurance mechanisms, the law "On Deposit Insurance" was adopted On 29 December 2006. Important activities are carried out in Azerbaijan to prevent legalizing criminally obtained money or other properties and financing of terrorism. In this regard, the law “On the Prevention of the Legalization of Criminally Obtained Funds or Other Property and the Financing of Terrorism” came into force on date 25 February 2009.

Role of commercial banks 
The initial development of the Azerbaijan banking system began in the second half of the 19th century. But institutional and legal construction of banking system of Azerbaijan began after the acquisition of state independence in 1991. According to the Decree of the President of the Republic of Azerbaijan dated 10 January 1992, the International Bank of Azerbaijan was established on the basis of the former USSR Bank for Foreign Affairs’ the database of the Republic of Azerbaijan.

Commercial banks in Azerbaijan constitute the second step of the two-stepped bank system like other countries with market economies. Four of the independent commercial banks were based on state ownership. 51% of their charter capital or the controlling package was owned by the state. These are the following:

 The Agrarian-Industrial Joint-Stock Commercial Bank of the Azerbaijan Republic 
 The Industrial Investment Joint Stock Commercial Bank of the Azerbaijan Republic
 Deposit Commercial Bank of the Azerbaijan Republic
 International Joint-Stock Commercial Bank of the Azerbaijan Republic

On 11 February 1992 by the Decree of the President of the Republic of Azerbaijan, the National Bank of Azerbaijan was established on the basis of the former USSR State Bank, Industrial-Construction Bank and the Agrarian Bank’s database of the Republic of Azerbaijan and Azerbaijan Deposit Bank on the basis of Deposit Bank of the former USSR database of the Republic of Azerbaijan.

From February to August 1992, the enterprises and departments of the Industrial-Construction Bank and the Agrarian Industry Bank were directly subordinated to the National Bank of Azerbaijan.

After gaining independence, the national market was established. During this period, changes were made not in the structure of banks, but in credit relations.

So two-stepped banking system was formed. The National bank was in the first step, commercial banks in the second one. After that, the Agrarian Industry Bank and the Industrial Investment Bank were removed from subordination of the National Bank and became Universal Universal Joint-Stock Commercial Bank. According to the relevant decision of the National Assembly, Deposit Bank and International Bank of the Azerbaijan Republic began to operate as joint-stock commercial banks. The process of transformation of the Agrarian Industry Bank, the Industrial Investment Bank, the Deposits Bank and the International Bank into joint-stock commercial banks was completed in 1993. The 49% of the private shares were distributed among different legal and physical persons. The National Bank started to function as an independent bank in the world. The first president of the National Bank was appointed after adoption of these laws. With the independence of the banking system, manat- the national currency of the Republic was put into circulation in 1992.

Strenuous political conditions and serious violations in the economy were observed during the period when the market economy-oriented banking system was set up in Azerbaijan. It put the banking system into a difficult situation. As a result, organization and managing principles in the banking system were violated. In general, the banking service did not meet the requirements of socio-economic development. The banking industry was based on a weak legal base. It was managed in accordance with the requirements and principles of former legislative acts. Only a few of the numerous banking operations known in the world were being performed in the country.

There were serious shortcomings and retail management situation in the Deposit Bank's system. They violated the rules defined by the legislation on repayment of these deposits in time. So, the deposits of the population in Deposits Banks have become invaluable and useless stocks. The Deposits Bank lost its essence. As a result of the implemented reforms, the defects and shortcomings in the banking system's activity were eliminated and significant improvements were made in their business. The fundamental changes in the modern banking system of the republic can be grouped as following:

 Fundamental reforms implemented in the banking system increased the rights and responsibilities of state and commercial banks;
 The role of banks and management functions increased in regulating money circulation;
 The preference is given to establish joint banks with the ability to compete with foreign banks in the Republic;
 The right was given to the National Bank to issue a free monetary policy and to issue money to the circulation.
 The role of all types of banks in the organization of the securities market in the republic was increased and the German model is preferred in this direction, etc.

In order to implement monetary policy, the norms of mandatory bank reserves were determined and their sources of origin were specified in the Law of the Republic of Azerbaijan "On National Bank" adopted by the National Assembly dated 10 June 1996. The law includes the establishment of mandatory reserves, determination of norms, regulation of liabilities between creditors and depositors and rules for maintaining mandatory reserves, etc.

Ratings
On 6 March 2014 Fitch Ratings released an assessment of Azerbaijan’s banking sector as being "broadly stable," although highlighted structural issues that should be addressed to improve the sector. Fitch noted that retail lending is a higher growth segment than corporate lending.  Fitch also affirmed positive ratings on five different Azerbaijan banks.

See also

List of banks in Azerbaijan

References